Napoleon is an unincorporated community located on the Pearl River in Hancock County, Mississippi, United States.

A post office operated under the name Napoleon from 1847 to 1905. After the post office closed, mail was routed to the post office in Huxford.

Napoleon was once home to a turpentine and camphine distillery.

Much of the community was abandoned after the creation of the Stennis Space Center.

References

Unincorporated communities in Hancock County, Mississippi
Unincorporated communities in Mississippi